Basteria is a bimonthly peer-reviewed scientific journal published by the Netherlands Malacological Society, covering research on molluscs. It was established in 1936 and is now published mostly in English. Since 2000, the editor-in-chief has been Edmund Gittenberger. A former editor-in-chief is Adolph Cornelis van Bruggen.

The journal is named after Job Baster, a Dutch naturalist of the 18th century.

References

Malacology journals
Science and technology in the Netherlands
English-language journals
Bimonthly journals
Publications established in 1936